The Archdiocese of Kampala is the Metropolitan See for the Roman Catholic Ecclesiastical province of Kampala in Uganda.

History
The present Kampala Archdiocese is the result of territorial changes:
 Victoria Nyanza Vicariate (1883). It was established by the Holy See in 1883 and was entrusted to the Missionaries of Africa commonly known as the White Fathers. Rubaga became the seat of the Bishop.
 Upper Nile Vicariate (1894). On July 13, 1894, the Holy See erected the Upper Nile Vicariate dividing it from Victoria Nyanza Vicariate and entrusted it to the Mill Hill Missionaries. Nsambya became the seat of the Bishop. The name of Vicariate Nyanza Vicariate was also changed to Vicariate Apostolic of Northern Victoria Nyanza.
 Vicariate of Uganda (1915). After the erection of vicariates in territories beyond the Nile on the southern side, the name of Northern Victoria Nyanza Vicariate became the Vicariate of Uganda on January 15, 1915.
 Vicariate of Kampala. On June 10, 1948, the name of Upper Nile Vicariate was changed to the Vicariate of Kampala which later became the diocese of Kampala in 1953.
 Archdiocese of Rubaga (1953-1966). The Catholic hierarchy in Uganda was established on March 25, 1953. The former Vicariates of Uganda became the dioceses of Uganda. Rubaga became the Archdiocese with 5 suffragan dioceses namely: Gulu, Masaka, Kampala, Mbarara and Tororo
 Archdiocese of Kampala (1966-). On August 5, 1966, the Holy See joined together what was part the Diocese of Kampala and the Archdiocese of Rubaga and created the Archdiocese of Kampala. It was covering most parts of Central Uganda. Since then, three other new dioceses have been carved out of it: Kiyinda-Mityana (July 17, 1981), Kasana-Luweero (December 16, 1996) and Lugazi (December 16, 1996).

Statistics
 Apostolic Administrator: Rt. Rev. Paul Ssemogerere
 Size: 3.644.75 square km
 Total Population: 3,592,053
 Catholic Population: 1,505,053 (42%)
 Parishes: 67
 Sub-stations (sub-parishes) 389
 Number of Priests: 324
 Diocesan Priests: 261
 Priests belonging to Religious Inst. 63
 Professed non-Priest Religious: 186
 Professed Women Religious 410
 Catechists 428
 Number of Seminarians (major): 173
 Catholic Universities 1
 Vocational Institutions 5
 Catholic-Founded Secondary schools 45
 Catholic-Founded Primary Schools 222
 Catholic Hospitals 4
 Health Centers and Dispensaries 20

Lubaga

When the Catholic White Fathers came calling in 1879, they were allocated land near Lubaga Hill. In 1889, the reigning monarch, Mwanga II of Buganda, donated them land on Lubaga Hill itself where they built Saint Mary's Cathedral Rubaga, beginning in 1914 until 1925, with the assistance of monetary contributions from Roman Catholic congregations abroad. The early missionaries had problems pronouncing the word Lubaga. They instead pronounced it with an "r" as in Rubaga. In Luganda, there is no word that starts with an "R". (Other Bantu languages from western Uganda and the African Great Lakes Area have words starting with "R".)

Later, the missionaries built a hospital and a nursing school on the hill. Today, Lubaga remains the seat of the headquarters of the Catholic Church in Uganda. It is the seat of the Roman Catholic Archdiocese of Kampala.

The remains of the first African Catholic bishop in Uganda, Bishop Joseph Nakabaale Kiwanuka and those of the first African Catholic Cardinal, Cardinal Emmanuel Kiwanuka Nsubuga are kept in the Catholic Mission on the hill.

Church landmarks
 St. Mary's Cathedral Lubaga
 Administrative centre of the Kampala Archdiocese
 Residence of the Archbishop of Kampala Archdiocese
 Lubaga Hospital: A 300-bed community hospital administered by the Catholic Archdiocese of Kampala
 Lubaga Nurses School
 Pope Paul VI Memorial Community Center
 Headquarters of Lubaga Division: One of the five administrative divisions of the city of Kampala.
 Lubaga Campus of Uganda Martyrs University, whose main campus is at Nkozi in Mpigi District.
 Kisubi Mapeera Secondary School

Special churches
The seat of the Archbishop is Saint Mary's Cathedral in Lubaga Division, in western Kampala. There two Minor Basilica of the Uganda Martyrs, at Namugongo in Wakiso District and Munyonyo Martyrs Shrine. Other important churches in the Archdiocese include (a) Lady of Africa Church in Mbuya and the Former Cathedral of Saint Peter at Nsambya

Bishops

Ordinaries
Vicars Apostolic of Victoria-Nyanza
 Bishop Léon-Antoine-Augustin-Siméon Livinhac, M. Afr.: 1883-1889
 Bishop Jean-Joseph Hirth, M. Afr.: 1889-1894, appointed Vicar Apostolic of Southern Victoria Nyanza {Victoria-Nyanza Meridionale}
Antonin Guillermain, M. Afr. † (12 Jan 1895 Appointed - 14 Jul 1896 Died)
Vicars Apostolic of Northern Victoria Nyanza
 Bishop Henri Streicher, M.Afr.: 1897-1915 see below
Vicars Apostolic of Uganda
 Bishop Henri Streicher, M.Afr.: see above 1915-1933
 Bishop Edouard Michaud, M.Afr.: 1933-1945
 Bishop Louis Joseph Cabana, M.Afr.: 1947-1953 see below
Metropolitan Archbishops of Lubaga
 Archbishop Louis Joseph Cabana, M.Afr.: see above 1953-1960
 Archbishop Joseph Kiwánuka, M.Afr.: 1960-1966
Metropolitan Archbishops of Kampala
 Archbishop Emmanuel Nsubuga: 1966 - 1990 (Cardinal in 1976)
 Archbishop Emmanuel Wamala: 1990 - 2006 (Cardinal in 1994)
 Archbishop Cyprian Kizito Lwanga: 2006–2021 
Archbishop Paul Ssemwogerere: 2021 - To date

Coadjutors
Jean Forbes, M. Afr., Coadjutor Vicar Apostolic (1917-1926), died without succeeding to see
Joseph Georges Edouard Michaud, M. Afr., Coadjutor Vicar Apostolic (1932-1933)
Emmanuel Wamala, Coadjutor Archbishop (1988-1990), future Cardinal

Auxiliary Bishops
Christopher Kakooza (1999-2014), appointed Bishop of Lugazi
Joseph Mukwaya (1982-1988), appointed Bishop of Kiyinda-Mityana
Matthias Ssekamaanya (1985-1996), appointed Bishop of Lugazi

Other priests of this diocese who became bishops
Augustine Kasujja, appointed nuncio and titular archbishop in 1998
Paul Ssemogerere, appointed Bishop of Kasana-Luweero in 2008

Suffragan dioceses

See also

References

Sources
 catholic-hierarchy

External links
 GCatholic.org
 Catholic Hierarchy

Kampala
Organisations based in Kampala
1915 establishments in Uganda
Kampala
Kampala
Kampala
A